"I Found Lovin'" is a song first released by the Fatback Band in 1983 by Master Mix Records and was included on their album With Love. The song reached number 49 on the UK Singles Charts in 1984. The song was re-recorded and released by Important Records in August 1986, upon which it reached number 55 in the UK. In January 1987, the original release of the song was re-released, which peaked at number 7 in the charts.

Track listings 
7": Master Mix / CHE 8401 (1983 & 1987, UK)

 "I Found Lovin'" (LP Version) – 4:05
 "I Found Lovin'" (Dub) – 6:11

12": Master Mix / 12 CHE 8401 (1983 & 1987, UK)

 "I Found Lovin'" (Remix) – 7:10
 "I Found Lovin'" (LP Version) – 4:05
 "I Found Lovin'" (Dub) – 6:11

7": Important / TAN 10 (1986, UK)

 "I Found Lovin'"
 "Is This the Future?"

12": Important / TANRT 10 (1986, UK)

 "I Found Lovin'" (The London Boys Mix)
 "I Found Lovin'" (The Anthem Mix)

7": ZYX / 1346 (1987, Germany)

 "I Found Lovin'" – 3:00
 "Is This the Future?" – 3:20

12": ZYX / 5749 (1987, Germany)

 "I Found Lovin'" (UK Master-Mix) – 7:10
 "I Found Lovin'" (LP-Version) – 4:05

12": ZYX / 5749 (1987, Germany)

 "I Found Lovin'" – 4:05
 "Is This the Future" – 6:05

12": SPR / 12-431 (1988, US)

 "I Found Lovin'" (Vocal) – 4:00
 "I Found Lovin'" (Hot Instrumental Mix) – 3:43

12" Promo: NFR / 0066 (1988, US)

 "I Found Lovin'" (DJG Lovin' Club Mix) – 6:37
 "I Found Lovin'" (DJG Lovin' Radio Mix) – 3:50
 "I Found Lovin'" (DJ Greek's Hard Head Mix) – 5:36
 "I Found Lovin'" (Next Moove Classic Remix) – 5:44
 "I Found Lovin'" (Axis Across the Track Remix) – 6:57
 "I Found Lovin'" (DJG Lovin' Instrumental) – 6:37

Charts

Steve Walsh version

British DJ Steve Walsh covered the song as his debut single in 1987. The song peaked at number 9 in the UK in the same week as the Fatback Band's version peaked at number 7. In the UK, it was released as a double A-side with a cover of Steam's "Na Na Hey Hey (Kiss Him Goodbye)" (whereas this was released as a B-side elsewhere). Walsh went on to record two more singles before his death in 1988.

Track listings 
7"

 "I Found Lovin'" (7" Edit) – 3:30
 "Na Na Hey Hey (Kiss Him Goodbye)" – 3:20

12"

 "I Found Lovin'" (Full Version) – 7:21
 "Na Na Hey Hey Kiss Him Goodbye" (Extended Version) – 4:59

 Track 1 known as "I Found Lovin' You What! (Megamix)"
 Track 2 known as "Na Na Hey Hey Kiss Him Goodbye (Large Mix)"

Charts

Other versions 
 In 1989, American R&B singer Jeff Redd released a cover of the song for his 1990 debut album A Quiet Storm which reached number 19 on the US Hot R&B/Hip Hop Songs chart.
 Also in 1989, American rapper B-Fats released a cover titled "I Found Love" from his album Music Maestro which reached number 53 on the US Hot R&B/Hip Hop Songs chart.
 In 1995, girl group All Saints (then known as All Saints 1.9.7.5) sampled the backing track of the Fatback Band's song in "If You Wanna Party (I Found Lovin')".
 In 1992, British rapper Monie Love sampled Fatback Band's version in her UK top 40 single "Full Term Love".
 In 2003, American singer Ashanti covered the song for her album Chapter II.
 In 2012, British singer Andy Abraham covered the song for his album Remember When....

References 

1983 songs
1983 singles
1986 singles
1987 debut singles
Fatback Band songs